Joseph Manuel Alexander Fernando ( Æleksænḍar Pranāndu; 25 August 194029 April 2020) was a Sri Lankan actor and stunt director in Sinhala cinema. Considered one of the best villains in Sinhala cinema, Fernando acted in over 120 Sinhala films, six Tamil films, and one English film.

Personal life
Fernando was born on 25 August 1940 in Kochchikade, Kotahena, Colombo. He was educated at St. Benedict's College, Colombo, and St. Anthony's Boys College Colombo 13. He was an excellent athlete in wrestling, boxing and swimming during his school years. At the age of 15, he became a member of the Armstrong Wrestling Club, Kotahena. He contested for the Western Province Schools wrestling championship and finished as the runner-up. In addition, he trained in karate, judo and physical fitness. In 1959, after his senior level examination, he joined the harbour authority as a tele-clerk. He gained fame as the undefeated national wrestling champion in 1961 and represented Sri Lanka at the 1962 Commonwealth Games. Fernando qualified for the 1964 Olympic Games in Tokyo and also participated in the 1966 Bangkok Nippon Asian Games. He later lost the opportunity to participate in several global sports tournaments due to a knee injury. He is the only actor in Sri Lanka to have represented his country in sports.

During his acting career, Fernando served as a sports adviser for the Colombo Municipal Council (CMC). He won an award from the Ministry of Sports in 2009 for his contribution to sport.

Fernando was married to Anoma Lumbini from 1978. The couple had two daughters – Anushka and Asha – and one son – Anojan Sudharshana. He resided with his wife at No. 103, Nathuduwa, Kelaniya.

Fernando died on 29 April 2020, aged 79.

Cinema career
Fernando started in drama by acting in Tamil stage plays. He acted in the plays Shalomi and Julius Caesar.

Fernando's maiden cinema acting came through 1963 film Wena Swargayak Kumatada? directed by T. Somasekaran. He served in a stunt role for Henry Jayasena in that film, even though his fight scene was eventually removed from the film. Then he continued to act in several commercial films in lead roles, including Haara Lakshaya, Sri Madara, Rajagedara Paraviyo, Saradielge Putha and Pasa Mithuro. Fernando was a close friend of popular singer H. R. Jothipala, cinematographer Lenin Moraes and the dancer Ronald Fernando.

In 1963, fellow stuntman and actor Robin Fernando invited him to act in the film Ruhunu Kumari directed by W. M. S. Tampoe. In the meantime, he acted in films Ataweni Pudumaya (1968) and Kohomada Wade (1969). He was brought to Hendala Vijaya Studios by film actor Senadheera Rupasinghe to act in the film Ataweni Pudumaya. His film Ruhunu Kumari also came out at that time. After the film became very popular, actor Joe Abeywickrama introduced him to veteran filmmaker Titus Thotawatte to act in the film Haara Lakshaya. In addition to its fighting scenes, his character included many lines of dialogue, the first time that Fernando provided dialogue in a film.

In 1972, Fernando acted in seven Sinhala films. In 1973, Sathischandra Edirisinghe handed over the stunt direction to his film Matara Achchi. Fernando joined with Edirisinghe for the film Sri Madara in 1977, as the lead actor. He also had the opportunity to act in a major role in the 1974 film Sahayata Danny directed by Yasapalitha Nanayakkara. During many villainous roles in the films, he acted opposite Gamini Fonseka in fight scenes. In one instance, he was injured by Gamini and could not open his eyes for three days.

In 1976, Fernando acted as the titular character in the film Saradielge Putha directed by Neil Rupasinghe. During this time, he had the opportunity to play several stage plays under the guidance of Anthony C. Perera and Jayamuni Nimal Silva. In 1983, he acted in the film Pasa Mithuro alongside Mervyn Jayathunga directed by Ananda Hewage. This film was a turning point in his film career, where he performed a realistic role as a Tamil prisoner. In 1984, Fernando won the Presidential Award for this role.

In many films, Sonia Disa played the lover of Fernando's characters. They acted together in many films including Sahayata Danny, Sri Madara, Aege Adara Kathawa, Kawuda Raja and Harima Badu Thunak.

Fernando also acted in Tamil films Yar Aval, Engleil Oruvan, Nangu Lechchami, Rattathi Thirtemme, and the English film Reincarnation.

Filmography and stunt coordination

References

External links

Sri Lankan male film actors
2020 deaths
1940 births
Stunt performers
Sinhalese male actors
Sri Lankan Roman Catholics